Keiler mine flail ('tusker') is a mine-clearing vehicle developed by Rheinmetall in Germany to meet German Army requirements. It is a conversion of the M48 Patton medium tank chassis in combination with a German MTU MB 871 Ka 501 liquid-cooled turbocharged Diesel engine.
The main role of the Keiler vehicle is to clear a lane through minefields to let soldiers and vehicles pass safely. A deployable mine flail system has been fixed to the front of the vehicle, being used to clear both anti-tank and anti-personnel mines.
Between 1997 and 1998, 24 vehicles of this kind were produced for the German Army.

Design
Keiler is built on the M48 Patton medium tank hull. Developers removed the turret of the Patton and fitted the vehicle with a heavy-duty rotor-powered mine flail, a rapidly rotating cylinder mounted between two arms in front of the vehicle consisting of two shafts with 24 chains terminating in large metal "feet". In traveling mode, the mine flail folds over the vehicle.

In common with other mine flails, the spinning cylinder swings the chains around, bringing the feet into contact with the ground, thus simulating the force exerted by a person or vehicle passing over the ground. If a flail strikes the ground above a buried mine, the impact will cause the mine to safely detonate. An automatic system fixed on the rear of the hull marks the cleared lane.

The Keiler has no defensive weapons except its smoke grenade dischargers. The vehicle is operated by a crew of two (commander and driver).

Propulsion
The original engine of the M48 Patton has been replaced with a more powerful, German MTU MB 871 Ka 501 liquid-cooled turbocharged diesel engine. This develops  in traveling mode, and  when driving the mine flail. A Renk HSWL 284 M transmission was fitted. The Keiler uses the same Torsion bar suspension as the M48 Patton tank, and has 6 wheels on each side.

Operators
  - As of 2021, 24 Keiler were in service.

References

Military engineering vehicles of Germany
Military vehicles introduced in the 1990s